La Pointe Indian Cemetery is the common name of the St. Joseph Mission Cemetery, located on Madeline Island in La Pointe, Wisconsin. It was added to the National Register of Historic Places in 1977. It is a frequently visited historical site.

History and origin

The cemetery traces its origins to a Catholic mission, started in 1835 by a Catholic missionary named Frederic Baraga. Fr. Baraga came to La Pointe from Europe in the summer of 1835, to evangelize the Native American population.

The mission was dedicated on August 9, 1835, under the name St. Joseph's Chapel. It was made of logs, and was located about 100 feet south of the current graveyard. The graveyard was consecrated the following year as the official burial place of the Catholic mission. However, earlier burials probably already existed at this location, as later archaeological studies have revealed several earlier ancient graves in the vicinity.

There are several notable historical people buried in the cemetery. Lake Superior Chippewa Chief Kechewaishke, also known as Great Buffalo, is perhaps the most recognizable. Also buried in the cemetery is Madeline Cadotte, whom Madeline Island is named after.

Name
The name Indian Cemetery is a misnomer. Although many Native American people are buried in the cemetery, it is actually also the burial place for many of the island's original white settlers. There is much ethnic diversity among those laid to rest at the cemetery, which includes all those who were associated with the Catholic mission. In reality, the more correct name for the cemetery is St. Joseph Mission Cemetery, which it used to be called, up until the middle of the twentieth century. In the 1950s, Madeline Island tourist literature described the cemetery as "the old Indian burial grounds", in an attempt to market the place as a historical tourist site. And while not actually being an only-Native American cemetery, the name "Indian Cemetery" stuck, despite being somewhat misleading.

Although not strictly a Native American cemetery, Native spirituality is given a nod, in certain aspects of the cemetery. In honoring an Ojibwe custom, many graves of Ojibwe people are covered with a "Spirit House". Such a grave covering is designed to protect the deceased buried there. Relatives would place food and other items inside the small shelter, to aid the soul of the dead on their journey to the afterlife.

The cemetery today

By the 1950s, shoreline erosion was threatening the piece of lakeside land that the cemetery sits on. To help stabilize the historic site, a plan was set in motion by a local congressman to have a breakwater built. Thus, at the time, the Roman Catholic Church transferred ownership of the cemetery to the federal government, so federal funds could be spent on preserving the historically important site.

For many decades, the cemetery has been a major attraction for summer visitors interested in learning about the island's history. But the site hasn't been without controversy. In the 1960s, many visitors and island residents were concerned about what many thought was neglect for the cemetery's condition. Being overgrown with grass and brush, and suffering from litter dropped by some tourists, the cemetery was described by some as being in deplorable condition. Some disappointed visitors went so far as to contact the Wisconsin Historical Society and insist that they seek some solution to help improve the historical site.

In 1977, the cemetery became listed on the National Register of Historic Places. Maintenance and landscaping has vastly improved in recent decades.

Due to past problems with vandalism, visitors are no longer granted admission inside of the cemetery gates. While visitors are still welcome and encouraged to see the site, visitors are asked to observe the cemetery from outside the metal gate, where there is a historical marker displaying the history of the site. The only exception to this rule is that of family descendants who may need access to a relative's plot.

The history and significance of the cemetery is discussed in the book, “Badger Boneyards”, by author Dennis McCann, on pages 135-139. 

There is a regional folklore that exists, regarding paranormal activity that occurs at the cemetery. Anecdotes about the paranormal occurrences might not be substantiated scientifically, but have surfaced in the form of popular tales told about the cemetery.

The cemetery continues to be a sacred site for descendants and relatives of those interred within.

History of other Native American burials on Madeline Island
Madeline Island has been inhabited for centuries by Native Americans. And as one might expect, there are other places on the island that have been used as burial grounds, throughout the centuries. While lacking any kind of grave markers, unknown by the general public, and totally lacking any type of marker to identify the locations, many ancient burial grounds on Madeline Island are mostly known by a few in the local Native community.

References

External links
 

Cemeteries on the National Register of Historic Places in Wisconsin
Native American cemeteries
Cemeteries in Wisconsin
National Register of Historic Places in Ashland County, Wisconsin